Throwing is the launching of a ballistic projectile by hand.

Throw, thrown, or throwing may also refer to:

Music
Throw (band), a punk band from the Philippines
"Throw", a song by Stabbing Westward from the 1994 album Ungod
Throws, a British indie pop duo formed by Mike Lindsay and Sam Genders, both formerly of Tunng
"Thrown", a song by Opshop from the 2004 album You Are Here

Science and engineering
 Throwing, in computer programming, a transfer of control when an exception occurs
 Throw, an element of an electrical switch

 Throw, in geology, the vertical displacement of rock strata at a fault

Sports
Throw (grappling), a martial arts move that involves throwing an opponent to the ground
Throwing (cricket), an illegal bowling action involving the straightening of the arm
Throwing a game, playing to intentionally lose

Other
 Mardi Gras throws, small gifts or trinkets passed out during Mardi Gras parades
 Throwing, another name for English knitting
 Throwing, the process of making ceramic ware on a potter's wheel
 Throw (projector), the distance between a movie projector and its screen

 Throw, the distance between gears as experienced by the driver of a manual transmission
 Throw, the act of rolling dice
 Throw blanket
 Throw pillow

See also 
Trow (disambiguation)